Rocky Island is a small off-shore island of the Red Sea, lying  from the coast, out  in the Red Sea Governorate of Egypt. This tiny uninhabited island gets some shelter from Zabargad Island ( to the northwest), but also gets fed from north–south currents, which attract lots of pelagic species that feed on or visit the resident marine life.

Rocky Island is well known by scuba divers as one that offers among the best diving sites in the Red Sea.

References

Islands of Egypt
Islands of the Red Sea
Red Sea Governorate